Uhu may refer to:

World War II
 Heinkel He 219, a German night interceptor aircraft
 Focke-Wulf Fw 189 Uhu, a German tactical reconnaissance aircraft
 An infrared searchlight-equipped 1944 variant of the Sd.Kfz. 251, a German armored personnel carrier

UHU
 UHU, a German manufacturer of adhesives
 UHU (magazine), a 1924–1934 German monthly
 United Hockey Union, a group of ice hockey leagues in North America
 United Hatters of North America, a defunct labor union

Other uses
 Uhu, the symbol for the chemical element Unhexunium
 Uhu (playing card), a trump card in a Tarock deck
 another name for the Eurasian eagle-owl
 Uhu, villages in Nigeria:
 see List of villages in Anambra State
 see List of villages in Kebbi State